Rainbow Falls State Park is a public recreation area on the Chehalis River one mile east of the town of Dryad, Washington. The state park's  feature  of shoreline, the waterfall for which the park is named, and some of the last standing old-growth trees in the Chehalis Valley.

History
The Civilian Conservation Corps built the park and its log structures in 1935. In 2007, the park suffered severe flooding which destroyed bridges along the Willapa Hills Trail as well as the park's main entrance. Park-goers began using an alternate entrance to the park in May 2008.

Activities and amenities

The park offers camping, hiking trails, fishing, and swimming. Visitors to the park can access the 56-mile Willapa Hills Trail via a spur trail.

The annual Pe Ell River Run ends at the park. Held since 1978, the event consists of entrants buying or building water crafts and floating down the Chehalis River from Pe Ell. Riders can float over the waterfall that still remains in the park despite severe flooding damage due to the Great Coastal Gale of 2007.

References

External links
Rainbow Falls State Park Washington State Parks and Recreation Commission 
Rainbow Falls State Park Map Washington State Parks and Recreation Commission

Parks in Lewis County, Washington
State parks of Washington (state)
Civilian Conservation Corps in Washington (state)
Protected areas established in 1935
National Park Service rustic in Washington (state)